The 2007 Indoor Cricket World Cup was an Indoor Cricket tournament that took place in Bristol, England from 22 to 29 September 2007 involving both a men's and a women's division. There were a total of 35 matches played in the men's division and 26 matches played in the women's division.

The men's division was split into two stages (in addition to finals) with each side playing each other once before being split into two groups, the top four and the bottom three. The top four sides progressed to a Super 4's stage where they again played each other once in order to be ranked for the semi finals. The semi finals featured Australia, England, New Zealand and South Africa with Australia defeating South Africa in the final to record their sixth consecutive World Cup. The top three sides contested a subsidiary title, won by England.

Whilst the women's division was not split into separate stages it did employ a more complicated semi final system that gave all five nations the opportunity of progressing through to the final during the finals stage. South Africa advanced straight through to the final after defeating Australia in the semi finals stage, though Australia then prevailed over New Zealand and were able to reverse their semi final result to defeat South Africa in the final. This was the fifth consecutive World Cup for Australia.

The 2007 Junior World Series of Indoor Cricket was held alongside this event.

Host Selection
The World Cup was awarded to England by the WICF at the conclusion of the previous World Cup. As a result, England became the first nation to host the World Cup twice having held the first tournament in 1995.

Venue
The England Indoor Cricket Association determined that the Action Indoor Sports Stadium in Bristol would host all World Cup matches and Bristol became the host city as a result. All World Cup matches were played at the same venue.

Participants
Men's Division
  Australia
  England
  France
  Guernsey
  New Zealand
  Pakistan
  South Africa

India were also initially entered in the men's division but were late withdrawals from the competition.

Women's Division
  Australia
  England
  New Zealand
  South Africa
  Wales

Round Robin tournament

Men's Division

Women's Division

Super 4's Stage

The top four sides at the conclusion of the round robin series progressed through to the Super 4 stage of the tournament. The bottom three sides were relegated to the World Cup Plate division and, together with the team that finished 4th after the Super 4's stage, competed for a separate subordinate trophy.

Men's Division – Top Four

Men's Division – Bottom Three

Women's Division

There was no Super 4's stage in the women's division.

Semi finals

The World Cup finals operated under a different format in each division. In the men's division the winner of the two semi finals proceeded to the final and the remaining two sides competed for the bronze medal match.

The World Cup Plate final was contested between the loser of the bronze medal match and the highest ranked side from the bottom three during the Super 4's stage.

The women's division employed a slightly more complicated format. The fourth and fifth placed sides faced off against one another with the winner taking on third place to earn a right in the preliminary final. The top two sides competed in a major semi final with the winner progressing to the final and the loser taking the second spot in the preliminary final. The remaining spot in the World Cup final was assumed by the winner of the preliminary final.

Men's Division

Semi Final 1 (1st vs 4th) – winner to final, loser to bronze medal match

Semi Final 2 (2nd vs 3rd) – winner to final, loser to bronze medal match

Bronze Medal Match – winner receives bronze medal, loser to World Cup Plate final

Women's Division

Major Semi Final (1st vs 2nd) – winner to final, loser to preliminary final

Qualifying Final (3rd vs 5th) – winner to minor semi final, loser knocked out

Minor Semi Final – winner to preliminary final, loser knocked out

Preliminary Final – winner to final, loser knocked out

Finals

Men's Division

World CupThe World Cup final was contested between Australia and South Africa. This final was the sixth consecutive appearance in a World Cup final and was the first for South Africa. Despite performing below expectations early in the tournament, Australia easily accounted for England in their semi final. The South African side, on the other hand, came through a tough encounter with the New Zealand side by just three runs.

In the end, Australia managed a narrow but comfortable victory to claim their sixth consecutive title.

World Cup PlateA secondary and subordinate final was played between England (the loser of the bronze medal match) and France (the highest ranked side from the bottom three teams). England rebounded from their heavy loss against New Zealand in the bronze medal match to claim the first Plate title.

Women's Division
The Women's World Cup Final featured Australia and South Africa. South Africa entered the side as favourites having accounted for Australia in all but one of their encounters in the earlier stages of the World Cup. Australia, however, rebounded and managed to claim their fifth consecutive World Cup title.

Player of the tournament
Nineteen year old Lee Irwin of Australia was awarded player of the tournament.

See also
 Indoor Cricket World Cup
 2007 Junior World Series of Indoor Cricket

References

International cricket competitions in 2007
Indoor Cricket World Cup
2007 in English cricket
Indoor Cricket World Cup